This is an article of notable issues relating to the terrestrial environment of Earth in 2022. They relate to environmental events such as natural disasters, environmental sciences such as ecology and geoscience with a known relevance to contemporary influence of humanity on Earth, environmental law, conservation, environmentalism with major worldwide impact and environmental issues.

For information about significant events in environmental sciences see 2022 in environmental sciences.

Events

Environmental disasters

See also

General
2020s in environmental history
2022 in climate change
Green recovery
2022 in space
List of environmental issues
Outline of environmental studies

Natural environment
List of large volcanic eruptions in the 21st century
Lists of extinct animals#Recent extinction
:Category:Species described in 2022
:Category:Protected areas established in 2022

Artificial development
Timeline of sustainable energy research 2020–present
2022 in rail transport
Human impact on the environment

References

 
Environmental